The University of Piura ("UDEP") is a private university in Peru. It has two campuses, the main one is in Piura, while a more recently built one is located in the Miraflores District of Lima.

In 1964, Josemaría Escrivá, founder of Opus Dei, at a meeting with professors from the University of Navarra in Spain, decided to create a new university. It was founded by St. Josemaría Escrivá de Balaguer and in 1969, it was officially recognized as a university.

Campuses
Piura
Piura is the location of UDEP's main Campus, extending over 130 hectares. More than half of the land is reclaimed desert.  It is reforested with mesquite trees where squirrels, deer, foxes, peacocks, lizards and different kinds of birds abound.
Construction of the Piura Campus started in the late 1960s, with much of its infrastructure financed by international support from the Italian, Spanish, German and Canadian governments.

Lima
UDEP has two campuses in Lima. The undergraduate students is located in the center of the Miraflores District, a picturesque suburban region of Lima on the Pacific coast. The graduate campus for Business Management is located in the district Surco of Lima. Its MBA is recognized as one of the top programs in Peru.

Academic areas

School of Medicine
 Department of Medicine

School of Economics and Business
 Department of Mathematics
 Department of Marketing
 Department of Finance
 Department of Business Policy
 Department of General Administration
 Department of Accounting
 Department of Economics
 Department of Service Management

School of Engineering
 Department of Engineering Sciences
 Department of Industrial and Systems Engineering
 Department of Electrical Mechanical Engineering
 Department of Civil Engineering
 Institute of Hydraulics, Hydrology and Sanitary Technology
 Department of Architecture

School of Communication
 Department of Audiovisual Communication and Online Media
 Department of Marketing 
 Department of Journalist

School of Law
 Department of Fundamentals of Law
 Department of Public Law
 Department of Private Law

School of Humanities
 Department of History, Geography and Art
 Department of Language and Literature
 Department of Philosophy
 Department of Cultural Management
 Department of Psychology

School of Educational Sciences
 Department of Early Education
 Department of Primary Education
 Department of Secondary Education

See also
 List of universities in Peru

References

External links

 
 Instituto Confucio - UDEP

1969 establishments in Peru
University of Piura
Educational institutions established in 1969
Private universities and colleges in South America
University of Piura